Chelisochidae is a family of earwigs whose members are commonly known as black earwigs. The family contains a total of approximately 96 species, spread across sixteen genera in three subfamilies.

They are primarily located in the more tropical Afrotropical, Australasian, and Oriental realms, even though some species, such as Chelisoches morio, are cosmopolitan. They are often dark in color, lending to their common name, and can vary in size. They can be easily identified due to a certain characteristic in their tarsi, involving a ventral projection on the second tarsal segment. Like most earwigs, they are omnivores, and their diet consists of the larvae of leaf-mining insects, as well as certain types of vegetation.

Genera
The family contains the following genera:

 Subfamily Chelisochinae Verhoeff, 1902
 Adiathella Brindle, 1970
 Adiathetus Burr, 1907
 Chelisochella Verhoeff, 1902
 Chelisoches Scudder, 1876
 Euenkrates Rehn, 1927
 Exypnus Burr, 1907
 Gressitolabis Brindle, 1970
 Hamaxas Burr, 1907
 Lamprophorella Mjöberg, 1924
 Proreus Burr, 1907
 Schizochelisoches Steinmann, 1987
 Schizoproreus Steinmann, 1987
 Solenosoma Burr, 1907
 Subfamily Genitalatinae Steinmann, 1987
 Genitalata Kapoor, 1974
 Subfamily Kinesinae
 Kinesis Burr, 1907

References

External links

 The Earwig Research Centre's Chelisochidae database Source for references: type Chelisochidae in the "family" field and click "search".
 Australian Faunal Directory: Chelisochidae
 An image of the family.

 
Dermaptera families
Taxa named by Karl Wilhelm Verhoeff